Aab-e hayat or Ab-e Hayat may refer to:

 Fountain of Youth in Persian literature
 Ab-e Hayat, Iran, a village in Kerman Province, Iran
 Aab-e hayat (Azad), an 1880 work on Urdu poetry written by Muhammad Husain Azad
 Aab-e-Hayat (Nanotvi), a book by Muhammad Qasim Nanautavi
 Abe-Hayat (film), a 1955 Bollywood film
 Aab-E-Hayat, an Urdu novel written by Umera Ahmad